Langley—Aldergrove is a federal electoral district in British Columbia. It encompasses a portion of British Columbia previously included in the electoral districts of Langley and Abbotsford.

Langley—Aldergrove was created by the 2012 federal electoral boundaries redistribution and was legally defined in the 2013 representation order. It came into effect upon the call of the 2015 Canadian federal election, which was held on October 19, 2015.

Geography 
Langley and Aldergrove.

Demographics

Members of Parliament

This riding has elected the following members of the House of Commons of Canada:

Election results

Notes

References

British Columbia federal electoral districts
Federal electoral districts in Greater Vancouver and the Fraser Valley
Langley, British Columbia (district municipality)
Politics of Abbotsford, British Columbia